A self-adhering bandage or cohesive bandage (coban) is a type of bandage or wrap that coheres to itself but does not adhere well to other surfaces. 

"Coban" by 3M is commonly used as a wrap on limbs because it will stick to itself and not loosen. Due to its elastic qualities, coban is often used as a compression bandage.

It is used both on humans and animals. For animal use, it is marketed under a variety of trade names such as "Vetrap" by 3M. It is commonly used on horses and other animals because it will not stick to hair so it is easily removed.

See also
 Elastic therapeutic tape
 Elastic bandage
 Buddy wrapping
 Athletic taping
 Horse leg protection

References 

Medical dressings